Lee Bo-hee (born 25 May 1959) is a South Korean actress. Lee won a number of awards for her film roles in the 1980s, including Best New Actress for The Green Pine Tree at the 22nd Grand Bell Awards, Best Actress for Eoudong at the 22nd Korea Drama and Film Art Awards, and Best Actress for You My Rose Mellow at the 24th Baeksang Arts Awards and 8th Korean Association of Film Critics Awards.

Lee Bo-hee is referred to as one of "The Troika of the 1980s" along with Lee Mi-sook and Won Mi-kyung, all three of which dominated the screen of the period.

Filmography

Film

Television series

References

External links 
 
 
 

1959 births
Living people
South Korean film actresses
South Korean television actresses
Best Actress Paeksang Arts Award (film) winners